The Estadio Municipal de Miramar is a football stadium located in Luanco, Asturias, Spain.  The stadium is the home ground of Club Marino de Luanco.

References

External links
Marino de Luanco Official Website 
Stadium featured on Estadios de España

Football venues in Asturias
Marino de Luanco
Sports venues completed in 1953